Pala is a small, mostly Native American, community and CDP located in the Pala Indian Reservation, located within San Diego County, California. For centuries a traditional gathering place of native peoples, it was selected in the early 19th century by Spanish Franciscan missionaries as the site of a mission to indoctrinate the Native Americans.

The community is north of Escondido in the San Diego-Carlsbad metro area. In the National Geographic Names Database, it is officially catalogued as feature number 1661174. The community is in ZIP Code 92059, and inside area code 760.

The community name may be derived from the Native American Cupeño or Luiseño language term pal, meaning "water."  Another possible origin of the name is the Spanish word pala, which means "shovel."

The community is in the Pacific time zone.

Mineral resources
After United States annexation of California following its victory in the Mexican–American War, Pala became known for its mineral resources, including gold and tourmaline. Numerous gem mines were established in 1890s, of which more than twenty are listed in the Mindat database.  Gem mines in the Pala District still produce tourmaline, with the pink variety as the regional specialty.

China's Dowager Empress Cixi of Qing Dynasty highly prized the pink tourmaline mined in Pala. Under her influence, China's demand for this gem created a boom in the California tourmaline industry after 1902, particularly at the Himalaya mine. Demand fell off about 1911, declining after the Empress died in 1908.

Pala was the site where morganite beryl was first discovered.  In 1902 it was found to have the first commercially significant deposit of kunzite, named after George F. Kunz, the godfather of gemology.

See also
 Mission San Antonio de Pala
 Pala Indian Reservation

References
 

Unincorporated communities in San Diego County, California
Unincorporated communities in California